Abacena accincta is a species moth of the family Erebidae. It is found in French Guiana, Costa Rica and in Brazil.

External links

images at Boldsystems.org

Boletobiinae
Moths of Central America
Moths of South America